Esther Candotti (née Robertson) (born 29 October 1952, in Trieste) is an Italian former archer.

Archery

She competed at the 1984 Summer Olympic Games in the women's individual event and finished 21st with 2435 points scored.

Family

Her son Erik Candotti is also an archer.

References

External links 
 Profile on worldarchery.org

1952 births
Living people
Italian female archers
Olympic archers of Italy
Archers at the 1984 Summer Olympics
Sportspeople from Trieste